Kalateh-ye Khoda Bakhsh (also Romanized as Kalāteh-ye Khodā Bakhsh and Kalāteh Khuda Bakhsh; also known as Ḩoseynābād-e ʿAlī Moḥammad (Persian: حسين اباد علي محمد) and Khodābakhsh) is a village in Barakuh Rural District, Jolgeh-e Mazhan District, Khusf County, South Khorasan Province, Iran. At the 2006 census, its population was 22, in 6 families.

References 

Populated places in Khusf County